Pataua is a settlement in Northland Region, New Zealand. It lies at the mouth of the Pataua River on the Pacific Ocean. Pataua North and Pataua South are separated by a footbridge over the estuary.

A community hall is run by the Pataua Outdoor Education and Recreation Trust that is now used mostly for school camps by Primary and Secondary schools from the Whangarei District. It was once a one-room school but the school closed in the 1980s due to low numbers.

In recent years a number of the surrounding beef farms have moved towards permaculture, sustainability, and ecotourism. It is also a popular surfing destination.

The local Pātaua Marae is a meeting ground for the Ngātiwai hapū of Ngāti Kororā.

Demographics
Statistics New Zealand describes Pataua as a rural settlement. The settlement is part of the larger Pataua statistical area.

Pataua settlement had a population of 183 at the 2018 New Zealand census, an increase of 36 people (24.5%) since the 2013 census, and an increase of 18 people (10.9%) since the 2006 census. There were 63 households, comprising 90 males and 93 females, giving a sex ratio of 0.97 males per female, with 39 people (21.3%) aged under 15 years, 18 (9.8%) aged 15 to 29, 93 (50.8%) aged 30 to 64, and 33 (18.0%) aged 65 or older.

Ethnicities were 86.9% European/Pākehā, 13.1% Māori, 1.6% Pacific peoples, 1.6% Asian, and 3.3% other ethnicities. People may identify with more than one ethnicity.

Although some people chose not to answer the census's question about religious affiliation, 65.6% had no religion, 29.5% were Christian and 3.3% had other religions.

Of those at least 15 years old, 30 (20.8%) people had a bachelor's or higher degree, and 15 (10.4%) people had no formal qualifications. 39 people (27.1%) earned over $70,000 compared to 17.2% nationally. The employment status of those at least 15 was that 75 (52.1%) people were employed full-time, 18 (12.5%) were part-time, and 3 (2.1%) were unemployed.

Pataua statistical area

Pataua statistical area had a population of 1,584 at the 2018 New Zealand census, an increase of 306 people (23.9%) since the 2013 census, and an increase of 453 people (40.1%) since the 2006 census. There were 540 households, comprising 804 males and 780 females, giving a sex ratio of 1.03 males per female. The median age was 43.6 years (compared with 37.4 years nationally), with 354 people (22.3%) aged under 15 years, 213 (13.4%) aged 15 to 29, 810 (51.1%) aged 30 to 64, and 204 (12.9%) aged 65 or older.

Ethnicities were 90.5% European/Pākehā, 16.1% Māori, 1.7% Pacific peoples, 1.1% Asian, and 2.8% other ethnicities. People may identify with more than one ethnicity.

The percentage of people born overseas was 18.8, compared with 27.1% nationally.

Although some people chose not to answer the census's question about religious affiliation, 64.4% had no religion, 23.7% were Christian, 1.9% had Māori religious beliefs, 0.2% were Buddhist and 1.1% had other religions.

Of those at least 15 years old, 246 (20.0%) people had a bachelor's or higher degree, and 183 (14.9%) people had no formal qualifications. The median income was $32,800, compared with $31,800 nationally. 219 people (17.8%) earned over $70,000 compared to 17.2% nationally. The employment status of those at least 15 was that 639 (52.0%) people were employed full-time, 225 (18.3%) were part-time, and 30 (2.4%) were unemployed.

References

Whangarei District
Populated places in the Northland Region